The South Orange-Maplewood School District is a regional public school district, serving students in pre-kindergarten through twelfth grade from the suburban communities of South Orange and Maplewood, two municipalities in Essex County, New Jersey, United States.

As of the 2019–20 school year, the district, comprised of 11 schools, had an enrollment of 7,353 students and 576.1 classroom teachers (on an FTE basis), for a student–teacher ratio of 12.8:1. 

The district is classified by the New Jersey Department of Education as being in District Factor Group "I", the second-highest of eight groupings. District Factor Groups organize districts statewide to allow comparison by common socioeconomic characteristics of the local districts. From lowest socioeconomic status to highest, the categories are A, B, CD, DE, FG, GH, I and J.

History
The school district has operated as a unified organization for the area since 1867 and under the current name since 1894. James Ricalton, a teacher, photographer and world traveler born in New York of Scottish parents who became the school district's first permanent teacher, helped set the high standard of education that persists in the school district to this day.

In October 2014, the American Civil Liberties Union filed a complaint against the South Orange-Maplewood School District in relation to its academic leveling and disciplinary systems, stating that the overuse of discipline and "zero-tolerance" policy, and implicit racial bias within the level selection system violate Title VI of the Civil Rights Act of 1964 and Section 504 of the Rehabilitation Act of 1973.

Awards and recognition
For the 1992–93 school year, Columbia High School received the National Blue Ribbon Award of Excellence from the United States Department of Education, the highest honor that an American school can achieve.

NAMM named the district in its 2009 survey of the "Best Communities for Music Education", which included 124 school districts nationwide.

Schools

Schools in the district (with 2019–20 school enrollment data from the National Center for Education Statistics) are:
Preschool
 Montrose Early Childhood Center (133 students, in PreK; located in Maplewood)
 Bonita Samuels, Principal
Elementary schools
 Seth Boyden Elementary Demonstration School (493 students, in grades K–5 located in Maplewood)
 Shannon Glander, Principal
 Sheila Murphy, Assistant Principal
 Clinton Elementary School (605, K–5; Maplewood)
 Jennifer Connors, Principal
 Sandra Smith, Assistant Principal
 Delia Bolden Elementary School (544, 3–5; Maplewood). The school, formerly known as Jefferson Elementary School, was renamed in 2022 in honor of Delia Bolden, who graduated in 1912 as the first African-American woman to graduate from Columbia High School.
 Kimberly Hutchinson, Principal
 Angel Rivera, Assistant Principal
 Marshall Elementary School (518, K–2; South Orange)
 Raquel Horn, Principal
 Laura Swyberius, Assistant Principal
 South Mountain Elementary School (647, K–5; South Orange)
 Kevin Mason, Principal
 Shane Zeigler, Assistant Principal
 South Mountain Elementary School Annex (NA, K–1; South Orange)
 Kevin Mason, Principal
 Shane Zeigler, Assistant Principal
 Tuscan Elementary School (K–5, 637; Maplewood)
 Malikah Majeed, Principal
 Brad Bertani, Assistant Principal

Middle schools
 Maplewood Middle School (827, 6–8; Maplewood)
 Dara Gronau, Principal
 Louis Brown, Assistant Principal
 Russell King, Assistant Principal
 South Orange Middle School (786, 6–8; South Orange)
 Lynn Irby, Principal
 James Jennings, Assistant Principal
 James Waldron, Assistant Principal
High school
 Columbia High School (1,967, 9–12; Maplewood)
 Frank Sanchez, Principal
 Melissa Butler, Assistant Principal
 Cheryline Hewitt, Assistant Principal
 Dion Patterson, Assistant Principal
 Terry Woolard, Assistant Principal

Administration
Members of the district administration are:
Dr. Ronald G. Taylor, Superintendent
Eric Burnside, School Business Administrator/Board Secretary

Board of education
The district's board of education, comprised of nine members, sets policy and oversees the fiscal and educational operation of the district through its administration. As a Type II school district, the board's trustees are elected directly by voters to serve three-year terms of office on a staggered basis, with three seats up for election each year held (since 2013) as part of the November general election. The board appoints a superintendent to oversee the district's day-to-day operations and a business administrator to supervise the business functions of the district. The district's tax levy is approved by an eight-member Board of School Estimate, which includes two members of the district's board of education and three elected officials each from Maplewood and South Orange.

References

External links
 South Orange-Maplewood School District
 
 South Orange-Maplewood School District, National Center for Education Statistics

Maplewood, New Jersey
South Orange, New Jersey
New Jersey District Factor Group I
School districts in Essex County, New Jersey